Dirty is the sixth studio album by the Italian industrial black metal band Aborym, released on 28 May 2013 through Agonia Records. It is a double album, with the second disc containing re-worked versions of older tracks and covers.

Track listing

Disc 1

Disc 2

Personnel

Aborym
Malfeitor Fabban - Vocals, bass, synthesizers, programming, samples, lyrics
Paolo Pieri - Guitars, synthesizers, programming, samples
Bård G. "Faust" Eithun - Drums

Additional
Emiliano Natali - Bass (additional)
Agonia BV - Vocals (additional) (track 6 (disc 2))
Emiliano Natali - Engineering, mixing, mastering
Fabban - Producer, mixing, artwork, layout, lyrics
Paolo Pieri - Producer

References 

2013 albums
Aborym albums